Fond du Lac is a city in Fond du Lac County, Wisconsin, United States. The population was 44,678 at the 2020 census. The city forms the core of the United States Census Bureau's Fond du Lac Metropolitan Statistical Area, which includes all of Fond du Lac County (2020 population: 104,154). Fond du Lac is the 348th largest Metropolitan Statistical Area (MSA) in the United States.

History 

"Fond du Lac" is French for the "bottom" or the "farthest point" "of the lake," so named because of its location at the bottom (south end) of Lake Winnebago.

Native American tribes, primarily the Winnebagos but also the Potawatomi, Kickapoo, and Mascoutin lived or gathered in the area long before European explorers arrived. Although the identity of the first European to explore the southern end of Lake Winnebago is uncertain, it was probably Claude-Jean Allouez, followed by French fur trappers. James Doty, a federal judge for the western part of the Michigan Territory, thought the land at the foot of Lake Winnebago might be a good location for a city, so he and his partners bought land in the area. In 1836, during the Wisconsin Territorial Legislature, John Arndt proposed making Fond du Lac the new capital. The motion failed, and Doty convinced the legislature to choose Madison instead. Colwert, Fanna Pier and Alex Tomasik were the first white residents of the area. In 1835, the construction of the Military Ridge Road began. It passed through Fond du Lac, connecting the forts in Wisconsin and Fort Dearborn in Illinois. The first school in Fond du Lac was built in 1843. The first railroad came to the community in 1852. About 1856, the first English-language newspaper in Fond du Lac, the Fond du Lac Commonwealth, was founded. Logging and milling were primary industries in the late 1880s, with access to the lake as the engine of the industry.

From June 1944 to August 1944, the Fond du Lac County Fairgrounds was the site of an Allied prisoner of war camp that held 300 German prisoners of war guarded by 39 U.S. soldiers. The prisoners worked on peas farms and in canneries that summer.

Historic districts 
Fond du Lac has 20 listings on the National Register of Historic Places, including four historic districts: the South Main Street Historic District, the North Main Street Historic District, the Linden Street Historic District, and the East Division Street-Sheboygan Street Historic District. Other listings include six houses, two octagon houses, two hotels, a church, a fire station, a train depot, an apartment building, a commercial building, and a prehistoric site. Most of the buildings listed in the register were a result of economic prosperity following the lumber industry boom in the Fox Valley and the newly rich building residences in the area.

Geography 

Fond du Lac is at  (43.775, −88.445).

Fond du Lac lies on the southern shore of Lake Winnebago. The east and west branches of the Fond du Lac River connect in the city and the river then flows into Lake Winnebago near Lakeside Park.

Climate 

As with the rest of Wisconsin, Fond du Lac has a humid continental climate. The record low was −41 °F (−41 °C) on January 30, 1951. The record high was 111 °F (44 °C) on July 13, 1936; the days immediately before and after that date hit 109 °F and 110 °F, respectively.

Demographics

2020 census
As of the census of 2020, the city population was 44,678. Ethnically, the population was 8.6% Hispanic or Latino of any race. When grouping both Hispanic and non-Hispanic people together by race, the city was 82.4% White, 4.5% Black or African American, 2.0% Asian, 0.7% Native American, 4.1% from other races, and 6.3% from two or more races. 

The 2020 census population of the city included 1,109 people incarcerated in adult correctional facilities and 609 people in student housing.

According  to the American Community Survey estimates for 2016-2020, the median income for a household in the city was $54,587, and the median income for a family was $70,061. Male full-time workers had a median income of $49,226 versus $38,715 for female workers. The per capita income for the city was $28,555. About 8.1% of families and 11.4% of the population were below the poverty line, including 14.8% of those under age 18 and 7.0% of those age 65 or over. Of the population age 25 and over, 90.6% were high school graduates or higher and 23.1% had a bachelor's degree or higher.

2010 census 
As of the census of 2010, there were 43,021 people, 17,942 households, and 10,395 families residing in the city. The racial makeup of the city was 90.6% White, 2.5% African American, 0.7% Native American, 1.8% Asian, 2.5% from other races, and 1.9% from two or more races. Hispanic or Latino of any race were 6.4% of the population.

There were 17,942 households, of which 29.0% had children under the age of 18 living with them, 42.3% were married couples living together, 11.1% had a female householder with no husband present, 4.5% had a male householder with no wife present, and 42.1% were non-families. 34.4% of all households were made up of individuals, and 13.1% had someone living alone who was 65 years of age or older. The average household size was 2.28 and the average family size was 2.94.

The median age in the city was 36.9 years. 22.6% of residents were under the age of 18; 10.1% were between the ages of 18 and 24; 27.4% were from 25 to 44; 25.2% were from 45 to 64; and 14.7% were 65 years of age or older. The gender makeup of the city was 47.7% male and 52.3% female.

2000 census 
As of the census of 2000, there were 42,203 people, 16,638 households, and 10,282 families residing in the city. The population density was 2,501.3 people per square mile (965.9/km2). There were 17,519 housing units at an average density of 1,038.3 per square mile (401.0/km2). The racial makeup of the city was 93.59% White, 1.86% Black or African American, 0.51% Native American, 1.52% Asian, 0.01% Pacific Islander, 1.27% from other races, and 1.25% from two or more races. 2.92% of the population were Hispanic or Latino of any race.

There were 16,638 households, out of which 30.6% had children under the age of 18 living with them, 48.4% were married couples living together, 9.8% had a female householder with no husband present, and 38.2% were non-families. 30.9% of all households were made up of individuals, and 12.5% had someone living alone who was 65 years of age or older. The average household size was 2.38 and the average family size was 3.00.

In the city, the population was spread out, with 24.2% under the age of 18, 10.7% from 18 to 24, 29.4% from 25 to 44, 20.4% from 45 to 64, and 15.3% who were 65 years of age or older. The median age was 36 years. For every 100 females, there were 88.7 males. For every 100 females age 18 and over, there were 84.1 males.

The median income for a household in the city was $41,113, and the median income for a family was $50,341. Males had a median income of $35,682 versus $22,492 for females. The per capita income for the city was $18,996. About 4.6% of families and 7.5% of the population were below the poverty line, including 7.9% of those under age 18 and 8.9% of those age 65 or over.

Government 
Fond du Lac has a city manager-council form of government. The city council is composed of seven individuals, who are elected to two-year terms. The current city manager is Joseph P. Moore and the council president is Kay Miller.
Fond du Lac is represented by Dan Feyen in the 18th district of the Wisconsin Senate, and by Jeremy Thiesfeldt and Michael Schraa in the 52nd and 53rd districts of the Wisconsin Assembly. At a federal level, Fond du Lac falls within Wisconsin's 6th congressional district and is represented by Glenn Grothman in the United States House of Representatives.

Religion 
The Wisconsin Evangelical Lutheran Synod has four churches in Fond du Lac: Redeemer Lutheran Church, Good Shepherd Lutheran Church, St. Peter's Lutheran Church, and Faith Lutheran Church.

Fond du Lac's population is about one-third Roman Catholic. In 2000 the six Catholic parishes merged into a single entity called Holy Family Catholic Community. St. Louis Catholic Church burned down in 2007 and the building was demolished. The St. Patrick and St. Joseph churches closed, while Sacred Heart, St. Mary, and St. Peter remain open.

The motherhouse of the Congregation of Sisters of Saint Agnes is in Fond du Lac. The order founded and continues to sponsor Marian University in Fond du Lac.

Fond du Lac is the episcopal see of the Episcopal Diocese of Fond du Lac. St. Paul's Cathedral is the diocese's mother church.

Fond du Lac also has a synagogue, Temple Beth Israel. Although Jewish people first came to Fond du Lac in the late 19th century, the first synagogue was not established until 1914.

The Church of Jesus Christ of Latter-day Saints maintains a local ward meetinghouse.

Education 

Fond du Lac is served by the Fond du Lac School District. Its schools include:
 Chegwin Elementary School (grades K–5)
 Evans Elementary School (grades K–5)
 Lakeshore Elementary School (grades K–5)
 Parkside Elementary School (grades K–5)
 Pier Elementary School (grades K–5)
 Riverside Elementary School (grades K–5)
 Roberts Elementary School (grades K–5)
 Rosenow Elementary School (grades K–5)
 Waters Elementary School (grades K–5)
 STEM Academy (grades 5-12)
 Sabish Middle School (grades 6–8)
 Theisen Middle School (grades 6–8)
 Woodworth Middle School (grades 6–8)
 Fond du Lac High School (grades 9–12)
St. Mary's Springs Academy is Fond du Lac's Catholic school system. It educates students in K3 through grade 12.

Fond du Lac also has four Lutheran primary schools.

The original Fond du Lac High School, built in 1922, was Fond du Lac's only public high school to 2001. The name of the high school changed to L.(owell) P.(ierce?). Goodrich High School, .  The original part of the high school, located solely on Linden St., was torn down about the time the new high school was built.  When the current Fond du Lac High School on Campus Dr. was built (which is still Fond du Lac's only public high school), the addition part of the former building (opened 1965), located mostly on 9th St. became partially the administration building for the school district (9th St.) and partially Riverside Elementary School (Linden St.).

Private secondary schools in Fond du Lac include: Winnebago Lutheran Academy, a Lutheran (Wisconsin Evangelical Lutheran Synod) high school; St. Mary Springs High School, a Catholic high school; Fond du Lac Christian School, an interdenominational K–12 school; and Trinity Baptist School, a Baptist K–12 school.

Fond du Lac is the home of three colleges: Marian University, a private Catholic four-year university; the University of Wisconsin-Oshkosh, Fond du Lac Campus, a two-year campus in the University of Wisconsin Colleges; and Moraine Park Technical College, a two-year technical college in the Wisconsin Technical College System.

Media

Newspapers 
 The Reporter – Daily newspaper, owned by Gannett Newspapers
 Action Advertiser – Free newspaper printed on Wednesdays and Sundays, also owned by Gannett.

Radio 
 KFIZ – One of the oldest radio stations in Wisconsin, broadcasts out of Fond du Lac. KFIZ first went on the air in 1922 when Oscar Huelsman turned on the transmitter. Branded as News-Talk 1450 KFIZ.
 WFON – Sister station to KFIZ. Country format. Branded as 107.1 The Bull.
 WFDL-FM – Sunny 97.7 FM is a radio station broadcasting an Adult Contemporary format.

Television 
 WIWN – A television station (virtual channel 68, physical channel 5) carrying Cozi TV; transmits from Milwaukee rather than its city of license to receive market-wide coverage (although Fond du Lac is part of the Green Bay television market).

Business and industry 
The largest employer in Fond du Lac is Mercury Marine, a division of the Brunswick Corporation. Mercury Marine, which has its world headquarters in Fond du Lac, is the largest maker of outboard motors in the world, employing approximately 2,500 people in its factory and offices. Other industry includes Giddings & Lewis, a manufacturer of machine tools, owned by the Fives Group; Brenner Tank, a builder of transport tankers; Chicago Tube & Iron, a division of Olympic Steel; Saputo Cheese; and J. F. Ahern, a mechanical and fire protection company.

Fond du Lac is also home to a Nielsen Corporation data gathering center. Other businesses include Charter Communications, Society Insurance and an office of Anthem.

Fond du Lac has one hospital, St. Agnes Hospital.

Shopping 
The main retailers in Fond du Lac include Kohl's, Walmart, Target, T.J. Maxx, Mills Fleet Farm and Menards. The primary grocery stores consist of Walmart, Pick-n-Save, Aldi, Save-Alot, Festival Foods, and Piggly Wiggly, along with smaller and ethnic supermarkets. Forest Mall was torn down in the summer/fall of 2020, with Kohls remaining. As of early 2021, a Meijer is announced to replace a portion of the old mall, and a Big Lots and Hobby Lobby now replace the former Shopko.

Culture 
Fond du Lac is the county seat of Fond du Lac County and the site of the Fond du Lac County Fairgrounds. The Fond du Lac County Fair takes place annually in late July.

Fond du Lac is also host to Walleye Weekend, an annual summer festival centered around the Mercury Marine National Walleye Fishing Tournament. Walleye Weekend, usually hosted on the second weekend in June is a "Free Family Fun Festival" held in Lakeside Park on the south shore of Lake Winnebago.

An annual fall festival is also held in September, called Fondue Fest. The festival was first held in September 2007 when a collaboration project between The Melting Pot and Brenner Tank created and set the Guinness World Record for the world's largest fondue set. The festival has been held since.

Fond du Lac has a children's museum, which displays rotating child-centric exhibits.

Sports 
The Wisconsin Timber Rattlers and Marian University have teamed up to create the Fond du Lac Dock Spiders baseball team in 2017. The Dock Spiders won the Northwoods League Championship in 2018 and 2020. The team uses Herr-Baker Field on the Marian University campus.

Parks 

Year-round activities include a whitetail deer exhibit. Summer activities include flower displays, boating, picnics, and weddings within the park. April 15 to October 15, the Lakeside Park Lighthouse(built 1933) and its observation tower are open to people. Visitors can ride on a miniature train and an antique carousel. The park also has four jungle gyms and a petting zoo. A steam locomotive stands at the Main Street entrance to the park, donated by the Soo Line in 1955. Lakeside Park hosts a holiday event featuring a "dancing lights" display, decorations and music.

Buttermilk Creek Park is a large, grassy, hilly park containing an amphitheater, tennis courts, two jungle gyms, and a sledding hill.

Other parks include: Taylor Park and Pool, Butzen (Danbury) Park, Jefferson Park, Fairgrounds Park and Pool, and Playmore Park.

Transportation

Airport 
 Fond du Lac County Airport 

Commercial airline service for Fond du Lac is provided by Appleton International Airport in Greenville and Milwaukee Mitchell International Airport in Milwaukee.

Rail 
Canadian National Railway operates the only railroad in Fond du Lac. Fond du Lac was the headquarters of the Wisconsin Central Railroad until 2001. It was part of the Soo Line until 1987.

Mass transit 

Fond du Lac Area Transit is the city's local public transit operator. The first public transit in Fond du Lac was a privately owned streetcar service in the 1880s; it converted to buses from 1944 to 1967. After several private operators, the bus system ceased operations in December 1967. In August 1968 the Fondy Area Bus Cooperative was established to provide bus service by support of private citizens and businesses, in lieu of a municipal one; however, it asked the city for financial support in 1970.

The current city-owned transit system began operations on January 15, 1973, following the successful passing of the referendum on November 7, 1972. It operates eight bus routes (with one of those routes operating only in the morning and afternoon to service K–12 schools), as well as a Paratransit service and taxi service for areas that the bus system does not reach.

Roads and highways

Notable people

Politics and law 

 William Aldrich, U.S. Representative from Illinois
 Warren Braun, Wisconsin State Senator
 Thomas Cale, U.S. Congressional Delegate from Alaska Territory
 Flora Cheney, Illinois State Representative
 Theodore Conkey, Wisconsin State Senator
 John P. Dobyns, Wisconsin State Representative
 Harrison H. Dodd, Mayor of Fond du Lac
 Mary Beth Dolin, Canadian politician
 F. Ryan Duffy, U.S. Senator and Judge of the U.S. Court of Appeals
 William H. Ebbets, Wisconsin State Representative
 Charles A. Eldredge, U.S. Representative
 L. J. Fellenz, Wisconsin State Senator
 Louis J. Fellenz, Jr., Wisconsin State Senator
 Maurice J. Fitzsimons, Jr., Wisconsin State Representative
 Rudolph W. E. Fritzke, Wisconsin State Representative
 Edwin H. Galloway, Wisconsin State Representative
 Earl Gilson, Wisconsin State Representative
 J. Herbert Green, Wisconsin State Senator
 Herbert J. Grover, educator and politician
 Corwin C. Guell, Wisconsin State Representative
 E. Harold Hallows, Chief Justice of the Wisconsin Supreme Court
 Joseph H. Hardgrove, Wisconsin State Representative
 William Hiner, Wisconsin State Senator and Mayor of Fond du Lac
 Charles Hoeflinger, Wisconsin State Representative
 Paul O. Husting, U.S. Senator
 Edward H. Jenison, U.S. Representative from Illinois
 Raphael Katz, Wisconsin State Representative
 Gaines A. Knapp, Wisconsin State Representative
 Louie Augustus Lange, Wisconsin State Representative
 Peg Lautenschlager, Wisconsin Attorney General
 Rensselaer Morse Lewis, Wisconsin state legislator
 William H. Loucks, South Dakota State Representative
 John B. Macy, U.S. Representative, drowned on the steamer Niagara
 Scott McCallum, Governor of Wisconsin
 Earl F. McEssy, Wisconsin State Representative
 Carlton W. Mauthe, Wisconsin State Representative
 Robert W. Monk, Wisconsin State Senator
 Charles Henry Morgan, U.S. Representative from Missouri
 Ronald E. Nehring, Utah Supreme Court Associate Justice
 Morgan Noble, Wisconsin State Representative
 William J. Nuss, Wisconsin State Representative
 Leo P. O'Brien, Wisconsin State Senator
 George B. Perkins, Iowa state legislator and businessman
 Tom Petri, U.S. Representatives
 Kate Hamilton Pier, lawyer
 John Abner Race, U.S. Representative
 Michael K. Reilly, U.S. Representative
 Henry Rollman, Wisconsin State Senator
 Samuel M. Smead, Wisconsin State Senator
 Thomas Wilson Spence, legislator and lawyer
 Samuel B. Stanchfield, Wisconsin State Senator
 George Eaton Sutherland, Wisconsin State Senator
 Nathaniel Tallmadge, U.S. Senator from New York
 David Taylor, judge
 Alfred L. Thwing, Minnesota State Senator and judge
 William K. Van Pelt, U.S. Representative
 Thomas S. Weeks, Wisconsin State Representative
 Owen A. Wells, U.S. Representative

Sports 

 Ed Aspatore, NFL player
 Bob Blewett, MLB player
 Ken Criter, NFL player
 Drake Diener, professional basketball player
 Travis Diener, assistant coach for Marquette, former pro basketball player, cousin of Drake Diener
 Jim Dilling, track & field high jumper
 Paul Erickson, MLB player
 Jim Gantner, MLB player
 Bill Guilfoile, baseball public relations
 Bert Husting, MLB player
 Colin Kaepernick, NFL quarterback
 Ann Klapperich, professional basketball player
 Nubs Kleinke, MLB player
 Polly Koch, professional football player
 Cory Raymer, center for Washington Redskins and San Diego Chargers
 Eric Schafer, mixed martial arts fighter in UFC
 Robert Windsor, NFL player

 Braelon Allen, football player for the Wisconsin Badgers

Military 

 Edward S. Bragg, Union Army general, U.S. Representative, U.S. Ambassador
 Charles Henry De Groat, Union Army general
 Charles Smith Hamilton, Union Army Major General
 Edward McGlachlin, Jr., U.S. Army Major General
 Hugh J. McGrath, Medal of Honor recipient
 James Megellas, U.S. Army officer who commanded company "H" of 3rd Battalion, 504th Parachute Infantry Regiment, 82nd Airborne Division in World War II
 Lyman M. Ward, Union Army general
 David E. Wood, Union army colonel

Other 

 Jeanne Bice, television personality, founder of Quaker Factory clothing line
 Brigid Bazlen, actress
 Jonathon Brandmeier, Chicago radio personality on WGN-AM
 Julia Colman (1828–1909), American temperance educator, activist, editor, writer
 Alice Arnold Crawford (1850–1874), poet
 Edward L. Doheny, oil tycoon
 Jeanna Giese, first person known to have been successfully treated for rabies without receiving a vaccine
 King Camp Gillette, inventor of the safety razor and founder of the Gillette Company
 Don Gorske, Big Mac enthusiast and Guinness World Record holder of most Big Macs eaten in a lifetime
 David St Peter, Human mascot for Lebakken's and Received service super star at 6 flags twice
 Gordon Hammes, professor
 Carl Kiekhaefer, founder of Mercury Marine and NASCAR team owner. 
 Ronald W. Langacker, professor of linguistics
 Christian Patterson, artist
 Daniel Plainview, oil baron
 Pablo Ervin Schmitz Simon, Roman Catholic bishop
 Darold Treffert, psychiatrist

References

External links 

 City of Fond du Lac
 Fond du Lac Area Convention and Visitors Bureau
 Early Fond du Lac County People and Places
 Sanborn fire insurance maps: 1884 1892 1898 1902 1908 1915
 
 Around the Corner with John McGivern – Fond du Lac Video produced by Milwaukee PBS

 
Cities in Fond du Lac County, Wisconsin
County seats in Wisconsin
Populated places established in 1843
1843 establishments in Wisconsin Territory
Cities in Wisconsin